The M422 'Mighty Mite' is a lightweight ¼-ton 4x4 tactical truck, suitable for airlifting and manhandling. From 1959 to 1962, the Mighty Mite was built by American Motors for the United States Marine Corps.

History
The vehicle was originally prototyped starting in 1946, making it the first all-new jeep to be designed for the U.S. military after World War II, and further developed during the 1950s by a team including four of the original Bantam engineers. A design called MARCO MM-100 by the Mid-American Research Corporation used a Porsche air-cooled engine and independent suspension. A unique feature was the absence of a conventional exhaust system. The prototype did not have a muffler or pipe rather the exhaust was routed through the frame. This proved to be an inferior design because the condensation and acidic fumes caused premature frame failure. A competing prototype by Willys, the 1953 Bobcat or "Aero Jeep", which would share as many parts as possible with the M38 and M38A1 to save costs, was rejected in favor of the more advanced M422.

Although the vehicle was to be used only by the U.S. Marine Corps, and it was therefore clear from the beginning that production numbers would remain limited, the vehicle was extensively engineered and incorporated many innovations.

Engineering

To keep the weight down, the M422 became the first U.S. jeep to be fitted with an aluminum body. At , it is the lightest of the U.S. military trucks to date. Also, this was the first U.S. small military vehicle designed with independent suspension all around (front: leading arms/trailing arms rear), sprung by ¼-elliptical leaf springs. Among the M422's many other unique features were front and rear limited-slip differentials, inboard differential mounted drum brakes, center-point steering, and the aluminum "AMC AV-108-4" V4 engine developed by American Motors. As with the M151, the transfer case only engages/disengages the front wheel drive and is part of the transmission. The full synchronization meant it could be shifted from 2-wheel drive to 4-wheel drive on the fly.

Although basically a two-seater, the little vehicle could theoretically move six people, thanks to two additional fold-up seats that were integrated into the functional tailgate, as well as two folding backrests on the rear fenders. And if needed, there was even a version of the M416 trailer specially adapted for towing by an M422: the M416B1.

Like other Marine Corps contract vehicles, the M422s came from the factory with all deep-water fording equipment installed, except for the pipes. In its early development stage the Marines developed a lightweight flotation kit that could easily be stored on the M442 when not in need, in which four large tubes inflated by exhaust encompassed the bottom part of the frame that allowed the vehicle to swim deeper waters. The vehicle's spinning wheels provided propulsion and steering in the water.

In 1958, seven prototypes passed grueling tests, and the first 250 vehicles were built by American Motors. These units went into mass production in 1960 and AMC built 3,922 Mighty Mites through 1962 for the U.S. Marine Corps. Over the years, the vehicle was produced in two model versions: the M422 and M422A1. The M422 had a tiny  wheelbase. After production of 1,045 units, the Mighty Mite evolved into the M422A1, six inches (152 mm) longer in both wheelbase and length, and  heavier. The first Mighty Mites to have the 71" wheelbase were an experimental model fashioned from an M422. They had an extended, frame and aluminum added behind the seat and crudely fashioned tool storage boxes. This model was the M422E1 of which only a few were made. Once put into production the 71" wheelbase model was designated the M422A1. Either model could be fitted with rear-mounted spare tire and a sturdier windshield similar to the Willys M38A1 that, along with top bows, would facilitate the use of a canvas winter top. The addition of the rear-mounted spare tire rendered the tailgate unusable.

At over US$5,000 per unit, it was relatively expensive, and by the time the Mite went into full production, the military's helicopters had become so much more powerful that the vehicle quickly became obsolete. The Marine Corps' Sikorsky H-19 with its  cargo limit (including crew and fuel), for which the M422 had been developed, was being superseded by the Vietnam era UH-1 “Huey", that could carry more than 1½ times that load. These factors may account for the small production total, as well as the short production time period.

See also
 Crosley Farm-O-Road, a 1950 jeep-like utility vehicle that was under ten feet long
 The British Royal Navy equivalent solution in the same period was to use Citroen 2CV pickup trucks.

References

External links
 
 
 
 
 
 
 
 Airborne Lightweight Jeeps Research Archives page

Mighty Mite
Military light utility vehicles
Military trucks of the United States
Military vehicles introduced in the 1950s
Motor vehicles manufactured in the United States
Off-road vehicles
Soft-skinned vehicles